Ekspress-A1 ( meaning Express-A1), also designated Ekspress-6A No.1, is a Russian communications satellite which is operated by Russian Satellite Communications Company (RSCC).

Satellite description 
It was constructed by NPO Prikladnoi Mekhaniki (ISS Reshetnev) and Alcatel Space and is based on the MSS-2500-GSO satellite bus. It is equipped with seventeen transponders.

Launch 
The satellite was launched at Baikonur Cosmodrome at Site 200/39 on 27 October 1999, at 16:16:00 UTC. The launch was made by Khrunichev State Research and Production Space Center, and a Proton-K / DM-2 launch vehicle was used. It is part of the Ekspress satellite constellation.

The Russian Ekspress-A1 communications satellite was launched in October 1999 but the Proton-K launch vehicle failed early in flight, during second stage burn. This is the second failure of the 8K82K Proton-K in 1999.

References

External links

Ekspress satellites
Spacecraft launched in 1999
Satellites using the KAUR bus